Washburn County is a county  in the U.S. state of Wisconsin. It is named after Governor Cadwallader C. Washburn. As of the 2020 census,  the population was 16,623. Its county seat is Shell Lake. The county was created in 1883.

Geography

Major highways

  U.S. Highway 53
  U.S. Highway 63
  Highway 48 (Wisconsin)
  Highway 70 (Wisconsin)
  Highway 77 (Wisconsin)
  Highway 253 (Wisconsin)

Railroads
Canadian National
Wisconsin Great Northern Railroad

Buses
List of intercity bus stops in Wisconsin

Airport
Shell Lake Municipal Airport (KSSQ) serves the county and surrounding communities.

Adjacent counties
 Douglas County - north
 Bayfield County - northeast
 Sawyer County - east
 Rusk County - southeast
 Barron County - south
 Burnett County - west

National protected area
 Saint Croix National Scenic Riverway (part)

Demographics

2020 census
As of the census of 2020, the population was 16,623. The racial makeup of the county was 92.9% White, 1.2% Native American, 0.4% Asian, 0.2% Black or African American, 0.1% Pacific Islander, 0.5% from other races, and 4.8% from two or more races. Ethnically, the population was 1.8% Hispanic or Latino of any race.

2000 census

As of the 2000 census, there were 16,036 people, 6,604 households, and 4,530 families residing in the county. The population density was 20 people per square mile (8/km2). There were 10,814 housing units at an average density of 13 per square mile (5/km2). The racial makeup of the county was 97.27% White, 0.17% Black or African American, 1.01% Native American, 0.19% Asian, 0.02% Pacific Islander, 0.12% from other races, and 1.22% from two or more races. 0.89% of the population were Hispanic or Latino of any race. 33.9% were of German, 11.4% Norwegian, 7.0% Irish, 6.2% Swedish, 6.1% English and 5.6% American ancestry.

There were 6,604 households, out of which 27.5% had children under the age of 18 living with them, 57.6% were married couples living together, 7.0% had a female householder with no husband present, and 31.4% were non-families. 26.7% of all households were made up of individuals, and 12.6% had someone living alone who was 65 years of age or older. The average household size was 2.39 and the average family size was 2.88.

In the county, the population was spread out, with 23.8% under the age of 18, 5.8% from 18 to 24, 24.7% from 25 to 44, 27.1% from 45 to 64, and 18.5% who were 65 years of age or older. The median age was 42 years. For every 100 females there were 101.3 males. For every 100 females age 18 and over, there were 98.3 males.

In 2017, there were 153 births, giving a general fertility rate of 70.0 births per 1000 women aged 15–44, the 17th highest rate out of all 72 Wisconsin counties. Additionally, there were fewer than five reported induced abortions performed on women of Washburn County residence in 2017.

Communities

Cities
 Shell Lake (county seat)
 Spooner

Villages
 Birchwood
 Minong

Towns

 Barronett
 Bashaw
 Bass Lake
 Beaver Brook
 Birchwood
 Brooklyn
 Casey
 Chicog
 Crystal
 Evergreen
 Frog Creek
 Gull Lake
 Long Lake
 Madge
 Minong
 Sarona
 Spooner
 Springbrook
 Stinnett
 Stone Lake
 Trego

Census-designated places
 Springbrook
 Stone Lake (part)
 Trego

Other unincorporated communities

 Beaver Brook
 Chicago Junction
 Chittamo
 Earl
 Lampson
 Madge
 Nobleton
 Sarona
 Springbrook
 Stanberry

Ghost towns
 Harmon

Politics

See also
 National Register of Historic Places listings in Washburn County, Wisconsin

References

External links

 Washburn County website
 Washburn County map from the Wisconsin Department of Transportation
 Washburn County tourism website

 
1883 establishments in Wisconsin
Populated places established in 1883